Ubykh may refer to:

 Ubykh language 
 Ubykh people
 Ubykhia, a historical land of Ubykhs

Language and nationality disambiguation pages